Kizhakku Vaasal is a 1990 Indian Tamil-language romantic drama film directed and co-written by R. V. Udayakumar. The film stars Karthik, Revathi and Khushbu. It was released on 12 July 1990 and ran for over 175 days in theatres. In 1992, the film was remade in Hindi as Mere Sajana Saath Nibhana and in Kannada as Sindhoora Thilaka. In 1995, it was remade in Telugu as Chilakapachcha Kaapuram.

Plot 
In a village named Kizhakku Vaasal, Thaayamma leads a cloistered life and does not visit anyone. She is worshipped as a holy lady upon whom the gods comes down to give them orders periodically. Thaayamma was an orphan and is found by Janagaraj, who is a street performer. They go from house to house begging for food. One day a lonely woman, Sulakshana, (a secret mistress of the village high man – Vijayakumar) accepts Thaayamma as her own daughter and Janagaraj as her brother, and makes them stay in her own house. After 10 years, Thaayamma attains age and some days later finds Sulakshana's occupation. She and Janagaraj attempt to leave her house, but Sulakshana suddenly falls ill and this stops their exit . After Sulakshana's death, Vijaykakumar, the head of the village, tries to take advantage of Thaayamma. But Thaayamma keeps dodging him and keeps herself chaste.

Ponnurangam is a folk singer who performs with his mini troop in nearby village occasionally for festivals. He works part-time as a labourer for Vijayakumar. He has a crush on Selvi, the daughter of Valliyuran (Shanmuga Sundaram), the rich headman of a neighbouring village and the brother-in-law of Vijayakumar . Selvi looks down upon Ponnurangam and tries to pull a prank on him by asking his mother to meet her father with a wedding proposal. But Ponnurangam's mother (Manorama) is beaten by Valliyuran's men while she visits his house with the marriage proposal and Manorama later dies in her sleep due to the trauma. Selvi repents her actions and falls for Ponnurangam, but he becomes dejected with life. Meanwhile, Vijayakumar arranges his spoilt son's (Thiyagu) marriage with Selvi to end their feud of 20 years and also to grab all of their properties through his son. Ponnurangam is asked to perform at Valliyuran's house the night before the wedding. Selvi apologizes to Ponnurangam for his mother's death and gives him money which he coldly rejects. Thiyagu sees them together. There is a fight between the families and the wedding is called off. Next day, Thiyagu and his men attack Ponnurangam and stab him in the back with a poisoned knife. Thaayamma takes care of Ponnurangam and love blossoms between them. Ponnurangam plans to marry Thaayamma. Vijayakumar tries to thwart them by abducting Thaayamma. He kills Ponnurangam's friend Maakan (Chinni Jayanth), but he is then attacked by the angry villagers and beaten up. The last scene shows Ponnurangam and Thaayamma leaving the village and walking away together.

Cast

Production 
Manobala was originally supposed to direct Kizhakku Vaasal; due to his commitments to Mera Pati Sirf Mera Hai, he could not take up this film, and was replaced by R. V. Udayakumar. The production was plagued with various problems. The set which was built for the film was burnt; storywriter M. S. Madhu suffered from fits after witnessing the fire. Actress Sulakshana was admitted to hospital due to nose bleeding. Udayakumar was hospitalised due to a car accident and he went into coma for one month. After recovery, he completed the climax of the film.

Soundtrack 
Ilaiyaraaja composed the soundtrack. All the songs are set in Carnatic ragas; "Ada Veettukku" and "Pachamala Poovu" are in Sankarabharanam, "Paadi Parantha" and "Thalukki Thalukki" are in Keeravani, and "Vanthathe Oh Kungumam" is in Mohanam. "Ada Veettukku" was inspired by Wolfgang Amadeus Mozart's 25th symphony, 1st movement. For the Telugu-dubbed version Thoorupu Sindhooram, all songs were written by Sirivennela Seetharama Sastry.

Release and reception 
Kizhakku Vaasal was released on 12 July 1990. N. Krishnaswamy of The Indian Express wrote, "The film moves leisurely at a pastoral face but without boring you. Though not without a cinematic craft, it manages to retain a flavour of reality and of some human interest". P. S. S. of Kalki praised the film, saying not only is there quality in Udayakumar's screenplay, dialogue and direction; acknowledging that we will see more surprises, we seem to be welcoming the younger generation. Despite being released on the same day as Anjali, the film became a commercial success, running for over 175 days in theatres.

Accolades 
Tamil Nadu State Film Awards
 Best Film – G. Thyagarajan, R. V. Udayakumar (director)
 Best Actor – Karthik
 Best Actress – Revathi
 Best Cinematographer – Abdul Rahman
Cinema Express Awards
 Best Actor – Karthik

Remakes 
In 1992, Kizhakku Vaasal was remade in Hindi as Mere Sajana Saath Nibhana and Kannada as Sindhoora Thilaka. In 1995, it was remade in Telugu as Chilakapachcha Kaapuram, despite already having been dubbed in the language as Thoorpa Sindhooram.

References

Bibliography

External links 
 

1990 films
1990 romantic drama films
1990s Tamil-language films
Films directed by R. V. Udayakumar
Films scored by Ilaiyaraaja
Indian romantic drama films
Tamil films remade in other languages